Lenglet is a French surname. Notable people with the surname include:

 Alfred Lenglet (born 1968), French chief superintendent and novelist 
 Clément Lenglet (born 1995), French footballer
 Raphaël Lenglet (born 1975), French actor
 Olivier Lenglet (born 1960), French fencer

Surnames of French origin